The year 1753 in architecture involved some significant events.

Buildings and structures

Buildings

 Horse Guards in London, designed by William Kent and John Vardy, is completed.
 State House in Philadelphia, Pennsylvania, designed by Edmund Woolley and Andrew Hamilton, is completed.
 New Branicki Palace, Warsaw, designed by Johann Sigmund Deybel, is completed.
 First stage of Horace Walpole's Gothic Revival 'castle' at Strawberry Hill House near London is completed.
 Kastrupgård in Copenhagen, designed by Jacob Fortling for himself, is completed.
 Carlyle House, Alexandria, Virginia, is completed.
 Cuvilliés Theatre in the Munich Residenz, Bavaria, designed by François de Cuvilliés, is opened.
 Schlosstheater Schwetzingen in Schwetzingen Palace, Baden-Württemberg, designed by Nicolas de Pigage, is opened.
 Confidencen theatre in Ulriksdal Palace, Sweden, with interior completed by Carl Fredrik Adelcrantz, is opened.
 Teatro Carignano in Turin, designed by Benedetto Alfieri, is opened.
 Church of Santa Caterina (Livorno), designed by Giovanni Del Fantasia, is opened.
 New church of San Geremia in Venice, designed by Carlo Corbellini, is built.
 Sunehri Masjid, Lahore ('Golden Mosque'), designed by Nawab Syed Bhikari Khan, is built.
 Outer Pagoda of Monk Wansong in Beijing is built.
 Barakoni church in Georgia is commissioned from Avtandil Shulavreli.

Births
 January 6 – Samuel Pepys Cockerell, English architect (died 1827)
 September 10 – John Soane, English architect (died 1837)
 Henry A. Baker, Irish architect (died 1836)
 Laurynas Gucevičius, Lithuanian architect (died 1798)

Deaths
 February 9 – Carl Hårleman, Swedish architect (born 1700)
 August 19 – Balthasar Neumann, German baroque architect (born 1687)
 December 15 – Richard Boyle, 3rd Earl of Burlington, English Palladian architect and politician (born 1694)

References